Michael Weiner (born April 18, 1975, in Los Angeles, California) is an American actor and composer.  He is probably best known for his occasional role of "Kellogg 'Cornflake' Lieberbaum" on The Fresh Prince of Bel-Air.  As a composer, Weiner co-produced the soundtrack album and wrote the score for the 1999 film Man of the Century and "The Song in Your Heart" episode of Once Upon a Time.

Filmography

Film
Man of the Century (1999)
Mr. Saturday Night (1992)
All I Want for Christmas (1991)
Coupe de Ville (1990)
Relentless (1989)

Television
Then We Got Help! (2010-2011) 
Felicity (1999)
Beverly Hills, 90210 (1995) 
Hangin' with Mr. Cooper (1993) 
The Wonder Years (1989-1992) 
The Fresh Prince of Bel-Air (1990-1992) 
Parker Lewis Can't Lose (1992)

Short films
The Murder of Donovan Slain (2004) 
The Fanatical Teachings of Julian Tau (2000)

References

External links

American male actors
American film score composers
American male film score composers
1975 births
Living people